The Milwaukee City Hall is a skyscraper and town hall located in Milwaukee, Wisconsin, United States. It was finished in 1895, and was Milwaukee's tallest building until completion of the First Wisconsin Center in 1973. In 1973 it was listed on the National Register of Historic Places.

Design

Milwaukee City Hall was designed by architect Henry C. Koch in the Flemish Renaissance Revival style, based on both German precedent (for example, the Hamburg Rathaus or city hall), and local examples (the Pabst Building, demolished in 1981). Due to Milwaukee's historic German immigrant population, many of the surrounding buildings mirror this design. The foundation consists of 2,584 white pine piles that were driven into the marshy land surrounding the Milwaukee River. From that base, the main block of the building rises eight stories, with the massive tower at the end rising to 350 feet, with its clock faces flanked by four "beer stein" turrets, and topped by a copper-clad spire. The upper part of the tower was rebuilt after a fire in October 1929.

The interior features a 20 x 70 foot open atrium, which rises eight stories tall and is topped by a skylight.

The tower holds a single bourdon bell named after Solomon Juneau, Milwaukee's first mayor. It was designed and crafted by the Campbells, who were early pioneers in creating diving chambers and suits near the Great Lakes area during that time. The bell weights 22,500 pound and was hoisted in the tower in 1896, first chiming on New Year's Eve.

History

City Hall was the marketing symbol of Milwaukee until the completion of the Calatrava wing of the Milwaukee Art Museum in 2001, but the bell tower continues to be used as a municipal icon and in some traffic and parking signs. Formerly the tower's front three sides were secondarily used as a lighted marquee, using three tiers of letters with various messages to welcome visitors, conventions and events, along with featuring messages timed to a holiday or achievement. An image of the City Hall marquee containing Welcome Milwaukee Visitors was one of the iconic images of the opening sequence for locally-set sitcom, Laverne & Shirley. The marquee was removed in 1988, and its letters were donated to the Milwaukee Institute of Art and Design in 2012.

From 2006 to 2008, the entire building was renovated, including a complete dis-assembly and reassembly of the bell tower, by J. P. Cullen & Sons, Inc., a construction manager and general contractor headquartered in Janesville, Wisconsin. Before the restoration began, the bell was rung rarely because of seismic concerns, and in the last few years an assembly of scaffolds with protective coverings had been in place around the building to protect pedestrians from falling stone and brickwork. The quality of the  restoration was the subject of a lawsuit filed by the city of Milwaukee in 2012 against various parties involved in the work.

City Hall was added to the National Register of Historic Places in 1973, and declared a National Historic Landmark in 2005.

See also
List of skyscrapers
List of tallest buildings in Milwaukee
List of tallest structures built before the 20th century

References

External links

A brief history of Milwaukee and City Hall
City Hall Restoration Project
National Historic Landmark nomination (PDF)
Emporis page
Fixing City Hall won't come easy
Questioning the Merits of Propping Up City Hall

City Hall
City halls in Wisconsin
Clock towers in Wisconsin
Government buildings completed in 1895
City and town halls on the National Register of Historic Places in Wisconsin
National Historic Landmarks in Wisconsin
Skyscraper office buildings in Milwaukee
Renaissance Revival architecture in Wisconsin
National Register of Historic Places in Milwaukee